The 2004 UEFA European Under-19 Championship was held in Switzerland from 13 to 24 July 2004. Players born after 1 January 1985 can participate in this competition. The tournament was won by Spain, who beat Turkey in the final. It also served as the European qualification for the 2005 FIFA World Youth Championship.

Venues

Qualifications
There were two separate rounds of qualifications held before the Final Tournament.

1. 2004 UEFA European Under-19 Championship first qualifying round
2. 2004 UEFA European Under-19 Championship second qualifying round

Teams
The eight teams that participated in the final tournament were:

 (host)

Match officials
Six referees were selected for the tournament:

 Gerald Lehner
 Levan Paniashvili
 Zsolt Szabó
 Alon Yefet
 Pedro Proença
 Douglas McDonald

Squads

Group stage

Group A

Group B

Knockout stage

Bracket

Semi-finals

Final

Qualification to World Youth Championship
The six best performing teams qualified for the 2005 FIFA World Youth Championship, along with host .

See also
 2004 UEFA European Under-19 Championship first qualifying round
 2004 UEFA European Under-19 Championship second qualifying round

External links
Official website at UEFA.com
Match list at rsssf.com

 
UEFA European Under-19 Championship
UEFA
Uefa European Under-19 Championship, 2004
International association football competitions hosted by Switzerland
July 2004 sports events in Europe
2004 in youth association football